Trissopelopia is a genus of non-biting midges in the subfamily Tanypodinae of the bloodworm family Chironomidae.

Species
T. conformis (Holgrem, 1869)
T. dimorpha Cheng & Wang, 2005
T. flavida Kieffer, 1923
T. fusistylus (Goetghebuer, 1933)
T. lanceolata Cheng & Wang, 2005
T. longimana (Sæther, 1839)
T. ogemawi Roback, 1971
T. tornetraskensis Edwards, 1941

References

Tanypodinae
Diptera of Europe
Diptera of Asia